ICONIQ Capital is an American wealth management and investment firm based in San Francisco, California. It functions as a family office that provides wealth management services to high net worth clients such as Mark Zuckerberg, Sheryl Sandberg, Jack Dorsey and Jeff Weiner. The firm also is involved in investments related to Private Equity and Venture Capital.

Background 

ICONIQ Capital was founded in 2011 by Divesh Makan, Michael Anders and Chad Boeding. The trio previously worked in wealth management at Morgan Stanley and Goldman Sachs. In 2004, Makan met Mark Zuckerberg as one of his clients, which would later help him meet other key members affiliated with Facebook such as Sheryl Sandberg and Dustin Moskovitz.

During his time at both Morgan Stanley and Goldman Sachs, Makan and his team had disagreements with the higher ups due to firm restrictions as well as being pressured to sell financial products from both firms.

Eventually, in 2011, Makan and his team left Morgan Stanley to set up ICONIQ Capital to serve as wealth advisors to their clients independently with more autonomy. This was close to the date of the Initial public offering of Facebook which the firm was also involved in.

In 2012, Will Griffith joined ICONIQ Capital and was a founder of ICONIQ Strategic Partners, which would become the investment arm of the firm. Previously, Griffith was a partner at TCV.

In 2018, co-founder Chad Boeding left ICONIQ Capital to form his own firm, Epiq Capital.

In 2020, Dyal Capital Partners acquired a 6% stake in ICONIQ Capital.

Business overview 
ICONIQ Capital is most notable for providing family office services for high net worth clients. Many of the firm's clients are involved in the Silicon Valley technology scene as well as Hollywood.

The firm also functions as an investment firm. It used to focus only venture capital investments in startups. However, it later expanded into investments related to private equity and real estate. Its investment business serves institutional clients such as the pension fund, CPP Investment Board.

ICONIQ Capital has a hybrid structure designed to reduce conflict of interest between the wealth management business and the investment business. In a written statement, the firm stated only a small amount of money from its family office clients are allocated into its investment funds, and it will always be at the client's discretion.

Notable high net worth clients 

According to Forbes and Business insider, ICONIQ Capital has served the following high net worth clients:

Facebook 

 Adam D’Angelo - Quora cofounder, ex-Facebook CTO 
 Chamath Palihapitiya - Social Capital CEO, ex-Facebook exec 
 Chris Cox - Facebook chief product officer
 Chris Hughes - Facebook cofounder 
 Dustin Moskovitz - Facebook cofounder, Asana cofounder 
 Mark Zuckerberg - Facebook founder and CEO 
 Naomi Gleit - Facebook VP product and social impact 
 Sean Parker - Napster cofounder, first Facebook president 
 Sheryl Sandberg - Facebook COO

Business 

 Arash Ferdowsi - Dropbox cofounder 
 Dan Rosensweig - Chegg CEO 
 David Bonderman - TPG cofounder 
 Diane Greene - VMWare cofounder, ex-Google Cloud CTO 
 Drew Houston - Dropbox cofounder 
 Eddy Cue - Apple SVP internet software and services 
 Henry Kravis - Cofounder of KKR & Co 
 Jack Dorsey - Twitter, Square CEO 
 James Murdoch - Ex-Fox Corp. CEO 
 Jeff Weiner - LinkedIn executive chairman 
 Joshua Kushner - Venture capitalist 
 Justin Rosenstein - Asana cofounder 
 Kevin Hartz - Eventbrite cofounder, chairman 
 Kevin Ryan - Gilt Groupe, Business Insider cofounder 
 Mark Pincus - Zynga founder 
 Mike Krieger - Instagram cofounder 
 Ric Elias - Red Ventures CEO 
 Ryan Graves - Ex-Uber CEO 
 Satya Nadella - Microsoft CEO 
 Sean Rad - Tinder cofounder 
 Travis VanderZanden - Bird CEO

Entertainment 

 Ashton Kutcher
 Blake Lively 
 J.J. Abrams
 Justin Timberlake
 Quincy Jones
 Rita Wilson
 Ryan Reynolds
 Tom Hanks 
 Will Smith

Investment Funds

Notable investments 

 ABCmouse.com
 Adyen
 Airbnb
 Alibaba
 Alteryx
 Apttus
 Coupa
 Crowdstrike
 CSL Group Ltd
 Datadog
 Dataiku
 DocuSign
 Epic Games
 ezCater
 Fastly
 Flipkart
 GitLab
 GreenSky
 GoFundMe
 Guild Education
 The Honest Company
 Lucid Software, Inc
 Modern Meadow
Motorway_(brand)
 Netshoes
 Netskope
 The Newbury Boston
 ONE Championship
 Pluralsight
 Procore
 Robinhood
 Snowflake Inc.
 Tencent Music
 Virtru
 WeLab
 Wolt
 Uber
 Zoom

References

External links
 www.iconiqcapital.com (Company Website)

American companies established in 2011
Financial services companies established in 2011
Financial services companies based in California
Private equity firms of the United States
Venture capital firms of the United States